Stephanie Ullrich (born 29 July 1984) is a German football goalkeeper who currently plays for 1. FFC Frankfurt. She has also been capped for the German national team.

References

External links
 

1984 births
Living people
German women's footballers
1. FFC Turbine Potsdam players
VfL Wolfsburg (women) players
1. FFC Frankfurt players
Women's association football goalkeepers
Germany women's international footballers